W20EJ-D (channel 26) is a ShopHQ-affiliated television station licensed to San Juan, Puerto Rico. The station is owned by HC2 Holdings.

W20EJ-D formerly operated W31DL-D (channel 31) in Ponce, serving the southern Puerto Rico area. W31DL-D was owned by Howard Mintz. The station shut down on August 1, 2018 and the license was canceled on October 4, 2018. The station also operated W27DZ-D (channel 27) in Mayaguez, which now serves as a low-power translator for WOST.

In June 2013, W20EJ-D (as W26DK-D), W31DL-D, and W27DZ-D (as W51DJ-D) were slated to be sold to Landover 5 LLC as part of a larger deal involving 49 other low-power television stations; the sale fell through in June 2016. Howard Mintz sold three stations, including W26DK-D, to HC2 Holdings in 2017; concurrently, HC2 purchased W51DJ-D from Sean D. Mintz.

Digital channels
The station's digital signal is multiplexed:

References

20EJ-D
Television channels and stations established in 2004
Low-power television stations in the United States
2004 establishments in Puerto Rico
Innovate Corp.